The 1934 World Archery Championships was the 4th edition of the event. It was held in Båstad, Sweden on 3–4 August 1934 and was organised by World Archery Federation (FITA).

Medals summary

Recurve

Medals table

References

External links
 World Archery website
 Complete results

World Championship
World Archery
International archery competitions hosted by Sweden
World Archery Championships